This article lists the discography of the late American Blues and Soul bassist, Donald "Duck" Dunn. Dunn was an influential bassist notable for his recordings in the 1960s in the house band for Stax Records, Booker T. & the M.G.'s and thereafter as a session bassist.

with the Mar-Keys
Mar-Keys (Great Memphis Sound, 1966)
The Mar-Keys/Booker T & The MGs (Back to Back, 1967)

with Booker T & the MGs
Booker T & The MGs (Soul Dressing, 1965)
Booker T & The MGs (In the Christmas Spirit, 1966)
Booker T & The MGs (And Now... Booker T & The MGs, 1966)
Booker T & The MGs (Hip Hug-Her, 1967)
Booker T & The MGs (Uptight, 1968)
Booker T & The MGs (Best of Booker T & The MGs, 1968)
Booker T & The MGs (Doin' Our Thing, 1968)
Booker T & The MGs (Soul Limbo, 1968)
Booker T & The MGs (The Booker T. Set, 1969)
Booker T & The MGs (Mclemore Avenue, 1970)
Booker T & The MGs (Melting Pot, 1971)
MGs (The MGs, 1973)
Booker T & The MGs (Best of Booker T & The MGs, 1986)
Booker T & The MGs (Hip Hug-Her, 1992)
Booker T & The MGs (And Now... Booker T & The MGs, 1992)
Booker T & The MGs (Doin' Our Thing, 1992)
Booker T & The MGs (The Very Best of Booker T & The MGs, 1994)
Booker T & The MGs (That's the Way It Should Be, 1994)
Booker T & The MGs (Time Is Tight, 1998)
Booker T & The MGs (Soul Men, 2003)

with Rance Allen
Rance Allen (A Soulful Experience, 1975)
Rance Allen (The Best of The Rance Allen Group, 1988)
Rance Allen (Up Above My Head, 1995)
Rance Allen (Let the Music Get Down in Your Soul, 1997)
Rance Allen (The Soulful Truth of The Rance Allen Group, 2001)
Rance Allen (Stax Profiles, 2005)

with Duane Allman
Duane Allman (Anthology vol. 2, 1974)

with Joan Baez
Joan Baez (Gulf Winds, 1976)
Joan Baez (Blowin' Away, 1977)
Joan Baez (Complete A&M Recordings, 2003)

with William Bell
William Bell (Soul of a Bell, 1967)
William Bell (William Bell, 1974)
William Bell (Little Something Extra, 1992)
William Bell (Bound to Happen, 1997)
William Bell (Soul of a Bell, 2002)

with The Blues Brothers
Blues Brothers (Briefcase Full of Blues, 1978)
Blues Brothers (The Blues Brothers, 1980)
Blues Brothers (Made In America, 1981)
Blues Brothers (Best of the Blues Brothers, 1982)
Blues Brothers (Dancin' wid da Blues Brothers, 1985)
Blues Brothers (Everybody Needs Blues Brothers, 1986)
Blues Brothers (Live in Montreaux, 1987)
Blues Brothers (Red White and Blues, 1988)
Blues Brothers (The Definitive Collection, 1992)
Blues Brothers (Blues Brothers & Friends: Live from Chicago's House of Blues, 1997)
Blues Brothers (Blues Brothers 2000, 1999)
Blues Brothers (The Blues Brothers Complete, 2000)

with Shirley Brown
Shirley Brown (Woman to Woman, 1974)
Shirley Brown (Shirley Brown, 1977)

with Roy Buchanan
Roy Buchanan (Loading Zone, 1977)
Roy Buchanan (Sweet Dreams: The Anthology, 1992)
Roy Buchanan (Guitar on Fire, 1993)

with Jimmy Buffett
Jimmy Buffett (Hot Water, 1988)

with Ray Charles
Ray Charles (Genius & Soul: The 50th Anniversary Collection, 1997)

with Keith Christmas
Keith Christmas (Stories from the Human Zoo, 1976)

with Eric Clapton
Eric Clapton (Money and Cigarettes, 1983)
Eric Clapton (Behind the Sun, 1985)
Eric Clapton (Crossroads, 1988)
Eric Clapton (Clapton Chronicles: Best of 1981-1999, 1999)
Eric Clapton (Money & Cigarettes, 2000)
Eric Clapton (Best Of Eric Clapton [Import Bonus Tracks], 2000)
Eric Clapton (Unplugged/Clapton Chronicles, 2001)

with Doug Clifford
Doug Clifford (Cosmo, 1972)

with Rita Coolidge
Rita Coolidge (Rita Coolidge, 1971)

with Don Covay
Don Covay (Mercy, Mercy/Seesaw, 2000)

with Crosby Stills Nash & Young
Crosby Stills Nash & Young (Looking Forward, 1999)

with Steve Cropper
Steve Cropper (Playing my Thang, 1980)

with Delaney & Bonnie
Delaney & Bonnie (Home, 1969)

with Bob Dylan
Bob Dylan (Shot of Love, 1981)
Bob Dylan (Bob Dylan 30th Anniversary Concert, 1993)

with Jesse Ed Davis
Jesse Ed Davis (Ululu, 1972)

with Willie Dixon
Willie Dixon (The Chess Box, 1990)

with Tinsley Ellis
Tinsley Ellis (Fire It Up, 1997)

with The Emotions
The Emotions (Sunshine, 1978)
The Emotions (So I Can Love You, 1970)

with Yvonne Elliman
Yvonne Elliman (Best Of Yvonne Elliman, 1997)

with Eddie Floyd
Eddie Floyd (Knock on Wood, 1967)
Eddie Floyd (Rare Stamps, 1969)
Eddie Floyd (Soul Street, 1974)

with Peter Frampton
Peter Frampton (Where I Should Be, 1979)

with John Fogerty
John Fogerty (Blue Moon Swamp, 1997)
John Fogerty (Blue Moon Swamp, 2004)

with Carol Grimes
Carol Grimes (Carol Grimes, 1976)

with Isaac Hayes
Isaac Hayes (Presenting Isaac Hayes, 1967)

with Ronnie Hawkins
Ronnie Hawkins (The Hawk, 1971)

with Ruby Johnson
Ruby Johnson (I'll Run Your Heart Away, 1993)

with Albert King
Albert King (Born Under a Bad Sign, 1967)
Albert King (Years Gone By, 1969)
Albert King (King of the Blues Guitar, 1969)
Albert King (Blues for Elvis - King Does the King's Things, 1970)
Albert King (Lovejoy, 1971)
Albert King (The Pinch or The Blues Don't Change, 1977)
Albert King (Best of Albert King Vol 1, 1986)
Albert King (The Best of Albert King, Vol 1, 1991)
Albert King (The Ultimate Collection, 1993)
Albert King (The Blues Don't Change, 1996)
Albert King (The Very Best of Albert King, 1999)
Albert King (Born Under a Bad Sign, 2002)

with Freddie King
Freddie King (Getting Ready, 1971)
Freddie King (Texas Cannonball, 1972)
Freddy King (Hide Away: The Best of Freddy King)
Freddie King (Getting Ready, 1996)
Freddie King (Ultimate Collection, 2001)
Freddie King (Texas Cannonball, 2002)

with Richie Havens
Richie Havens (End of the Beginning, 1976)
Richie Havens (Dreaming As One: The A&M Years, 2004)

with Levon Helm
Levon Helm (Levon Helm & The RCO All Stars, 1977)
Levon Helm (Levon Helm & The RCO All-Stars, 1996)

with Herbie Mann
Herbie Mann (Push Push, 1971)

with Chris Hillman
Chris Hillman (Slippin' Away, 1976)

with Jerry Lee Lewis
Jerry Lee Lewis (All Killer, No Filler: The Anthology, 1993)
Jerry Lee Lewis (Mercury Smashes... and Rockin' Sessions, 2000)
Jerry Lee Lewis (Southern Roots: Boogie Woogie Country Man, 2004)

with The Manhattan Transfer
The Manhattan Transfer (Pastiche, 1976)
The Manhattan Transfer (Pastiche, 1978)
The Manhattan Transfer (Pastiche, 1994)

with Mel & Tim
Mel & Tim (Starting All Over Again, 1972)

with Stevie Nicks
Stevie Nicks (Bella Donna, 1981)
Stevie Nicks (Timespace: The Best of Stevie Nicks, 1991)
Stevie Nicks (Enchanted: The Works of Stevie Nicks, 1998)

with Don Nix
Don Nix (Living by the Days, 1971)

with Tom Petty & The Heartbreakers
Tom Petty & The Heartbreakers (Damn the Torpedoes, 1979)
Tom Petty & The Heartbreakers (Hard Promises, 1981)
Tom Petty & The Heartbreakers (Playback, 1995)
Tom Petty & The Heartbreakers (Anthology: Through the Years, 2000)

with Wilson Pickett
Wilson Pickett (In the Midnight Hour, 1965)
Wilson Pickett (The Exciting Wilson Pickett, 1966)
Wilson Pickett (Wilson Pickett's Greatest Hits, 1985)
Wilson Pickett (A Man and a Half: The Best of Wilson Pickett, 1992)
Wilson Pickett (In the Midnight Hour, 1993)

with David Porter
David Porter (Victim of the Joke?: An Opera, 1971)
David Porter (Victim of the Joke?, 1995)

with Elvis Presley
Elvis Presley (Raised On Rock/For Ol' Times Sake, 1973)

with John Prine
John Prine (Common Sense, 1975)
John Prine (Prime Prine, 1976)
John Prine (Great Days: The John Prine Anthology, 1993)

with Otis Redding
Otis Redding (Pain In My Heart, 1964)
Otis Redding (The Great Otis Redding Sings Soul Ballads, 1965)
Otis Redding (Otis Blue/Otis Redding Sings Soul, 1966)
Otis Redding (The Soul Album, 1966)
Otis Redding (Live in Europe, 1967)
Otis Redding & Carla Thomas (King & Queen, 1967)
Otis Redding (Dock of the Bay, 1968)
Otis Redding (The Immortal Otis Redding, 1968)
Otis Redding (Love Man, 1969)
Otis Redding (Tell the Truth, 1970)
Otis Redding (Otis! The Definitive Otis Redding, 1993)
Otis Redding (Otis Redding Sings Soul, 1993)
Otis Redding (Dreams to Remember: The Otis Redding Anthology, 1998)

with Bruce Roberts
Bruce Roberts (Bruce Roberts, 1978)

with Leon Russell
Leon Russell (Will o' The Wisp, 1975)
Leon Russell (Best Of Leon Russell, 1976)
Leon Russell (Retrospective, 1997)

with Mitch Ryder
Mitch Ryder (The Detroit Memphis Experiment, 1969)

with Sam & Dave
Sam & Dave (Back at 'Cha!, 1976)
Sam & Dave (The Very Best Of Same & Dave, 1995)

with Leo Sayer
Leo Sayer (Here, 1979)
Leo Sayer (Here, 2003)

with Boz Scaggs
Boz Scaggs (My Time: The Anthology 1969–1997, 1997)

with Mavis Staples
Mavis Staples (Mavis Staples, 1969)
Mavis Staples (Only for the Lonely, 1970)

with The Staples Singers
The Staples Singers (Soul Folk in Action, 1968)
The Staple Singers (This Time Around, 1981)

with Rod Stewart
Rod Stewart (Atlantic Crossing, 1975)
Rod Stewart (A Night on the Town, 1976)

with The Soul Children
The Soul Children (Soul Children/Best Of Two Worlds, 1995)
The Soul Children (Genesis/Friction, 1999)

with Billy Swan
Billy Swan (You're OK, I'm OK, 1978)

with Tavares
Tavares (Best of Tavares, 1996)

with Johnnie Taylor
Johnnie Taylor (Who's Making Love, 1968)
Johnnie Taylor (The Johnnie Taylor Philosophy Continues, 1969)
Johnnie Taylor (Who's Making Love, 1991)
Johnnie Taylor (Lifetime, 2000)

with Carla Thomas
Carla Thomas (Hidden Gems, 1991)
Carla Thomas (Gee Whiz: The Best Of Carla Thomas, 1994)
Carla Thomas (Love Means Carla Thomas/Memphis Queen, 1997)

with Mickey Thomas
Mickey Thomas (As Long As You Love Me, 1976)
Mickey Thomas (As long as you love me, 1977)

with Rufus Thomas
Rufus Thomas (Can't Get Away From This Dog, 1992)

with Muddy Waters
Muddy Waters (Fathers and Sons, 1969)
Muddy Waters (Muddy & The Wolf, 1974)
Muddy Waters (Chess Box, 1990)
Muddy Waters (Goodbye Newport Blues, 1995)

with Tony Joe White
Tony Joe White (Lake Placid Blues, 1995)

with Bill Withers
Bill Withers (Just as I Am, 1971)
Bill Withers (The Best Of Bill Withers, 1994)
Bill Withers (Lean on Me: The Best of Bill Withers, 2000)

with Neil Young
Neil Young (Silver & Gold, 2000)
Neil Young (Road Rock Vol 1: Friends & Relatives, 2000)
Neil Young (Are You Passionate?, 2002)

Various artist compilations
Guitar Showdown at the Dusk 'Til Dawn Blues Festival, 1966
Various Artists (Monterrey International Pop Festival, 1967)
Various Artists (Soul Christmas, 1968)
Various Artists (Atlantic Blues, 1986)
Soundtrack (The Great Outdoors, 1988)
Soundtrack (Roadhouse, 1989)
Legends Of Guitar (Electric Blues Vol.1, 1990)
Various Artists (Atlantic Rhythm & Blues 1947-1974, 1991)
Various Artists (Blues Masters Vol 1: Urban Blues, 1992)
Various Artists (Stax/Volt Review, Vol 3: Live In Europe - Hit The Road Stax, 1992)
Blues Masters Sampler (1993)
Various Artists (The Complete Stax-Volt Soul Singles Vol 2: 1968-1971, 1993)
The Original Soul Christmas (1994)
Various Artists (Texas Music, Vol 1: Postwar Blues Combos, 1994)
Various Artists (Blues Masters Vol 1-5, 1995)
Various Artists (Jingle Bell Jam: Jazz Christmas Classics, 1995)
Various Artists (Original Soul Christmas, 1995)
Various Artists (Mean Old World: The Blues from 1940 to 1994, 1996)
Soundtrack (Vampires, 1998)
Soundtrack (Martin Scorsese Presents the Blues: A Musical Journey, 2003)
Various Artists (Soul Comes Home: Celebration of Stax Records, 2004)

References

Dunn, Donald